Peter Joseph Fitzgerald (16 June 1937 – 29 June 2013) was an Irish professional footballer.

A centre forward Fitzgerald was one of the famous six Waterford brothers who played for the Waterford Blues. Tommy, Jack, Ned, Denny and Paul were the others. Along with Alfie Hale he made a scoring League of Ireland debut at Kilcohan Park on St Patrick's Day 1957 in a 3–1 win over Bohemians. His brother Jack setting up his goal which Peter finished with a grand header 

Along with two of his brothers Peter played in the 1959 FAI Cup Final against St Patrick's Athletic. He scored in the first game at Dalymount Park and in the replay which the Blues lost 2-1 

In May 1959 Fitzgerald was signed by Dutch Champions Sparta Rotterdam. In the 1959–60 European Cup Fitzgerald played against Rangers in the quarter finals where they were eliminated after a playoff at Highbury Stadium.

He was signed by Leeds Manager Jack Taylor as his final signing before the start of the 1960–61 season. He was in the first-ever team selected by Don Revie. On 18 March 1961, Fitzgerald was at inside right, with Jack Charlton the emergency centre forward, in a 3–1 loss to Portsmouth.

Fitzgerald moved on to Chester City F.C. for a fee of £5,500 in July 1961. After a good two years, scoring 12 goals in 80 games, he returned home to Ireland in September 1963 to play for Waterford.

The following month Fitzgerald made his debut for the League of Ireland XI. In what was one of the greatest results for a League of Ireland selection they beat their English counterparts, who included Bobby Moore,  2–1 in front of 25,000 at Dalymount 

In August 1967 Fitzgerald had his testimonial game against Leeds 

Fitzgerald later had a spell as caretaker manager of Waterford United at the end of the 1995–96 League of Ireland season.

He also played five times for the Republic of Ireland national football team, scoring twice in his second appearance, against Norway.

His brother Jack scored 130 League of Ireland goals  and his father Michael was Chairman of Waterford.

Honours
 League of Ireland
 Waterford - 1965/66
 Munster Senior Cup: 2 
 Cork Hibernians - 1964/65
 Waterford - 1965/66

References 

 Peter Fitzgerald, Post War English & Scottish Football League A - Z Player's Transfer Database

1937 births
2013 deaths
Republic of Ireland association footballers
Republic of Ireland expatriate association footballers
Republic of Ireland international footballers
League of Ireland players
Waterford F.C. players
Cork Hibernians F.C. players
Leeds United F.C. players
Chester City F.C. players
English Football League players
Republic of Ireland football managers
Waterford F.C. managers
League of Ireland managers
League of Ireland XI players
Association footballers from County Waterford
Sparta Rotterdam players
Eredivisie players
Irish expatriate sportspeople in the Netherlands
Expatriate footballers in the Netherlands
Association football forwards